Denis Kochetkov is a Russian professional ice hockey forward who currently plays for HC Dinamo Minsk of the Kontinental Hockey League (KHL).

References

Living people
HC Dinamo Minsk players
HC Donbass players
Barys Nur-Sultan players
Year of birth missing (living people)
Russian ice hockey forwards